Porcelain is a Danish Alternative Rock band.  It was formed in 1996 by Peter Urban, Jesper Urban and Anders Lorentzen. The original line-up was:

 Peter Urban (Vocals and guitars)
 Jesper Urban (Guitars)
 Anders Lorentzen (Guitars)
 Lasse Engelbrecht (Drums)
 Jakob Mørkholt (Bass)

Lovesize
Porcelain recorded it first 4-track single “Lovesize” at Sweet Silence Studios with producer Leo Wassinger. “Lovesize” received airplay from national and local radio stations and led to interest from major and independent labels. 

In 1997, Porcelain accepted an offer from the Indy label Lidocaine and started writing new songs for a full-length album. That summer, the band left for Manchester, United Kingdom, to record with Mark Pilkington. The band wanted to bring more electronic elements to the music. Lorentzen left the band and was replaced by Morten Pauck.

Perfect Daze
The new album  Perfect Daze was released in 1997. Porcelain performed its first national tour in the spring 1998 accompanied by the  violinist Vivi .... Mørkholt left the band and was replaced by Christian Odor. During the tour Porcelain played with The Ark. Porcelain also played a memorial concert for Jeff Buckley together with Steen Jørgensen of Sort Sol, Kasper Eistrup of Kashmir, Mikael Simpson and Hanne Boel.

Tomorrow will be Great
After the tour Porcelain started writing new songs for a follow-up album to Perfect Daze. The band also started recording demos and songs with producer Magnus Groth. The recording took place in the studio “The Space”. Together with Magnus Groth, Porcelain headed into a more melodic and less noisy direction. The new album, titled “Tomorrow will be great”, was released in 2001. The album was followed up by a tour playing several shows with Tim Christensen.

Glittergirl
In 2006 Porcelain  formed a new line-up with drummer Jesper Valentin Holm and Niels Ole Præstbo as lead singer Peter Urban wanted to create a more authentic and tight rock sound. The band teamed up with producer Morten Munck from the Millfactory studio. The recordings resulted in the band's second 4-track single. The song "Glittergirl" made it "song of the week" on the American music network Reverb Nation. The band celebrated the success playing a short tour.

Members
 Peter Urban, Vocals and Guitars
 Jesper Urban, Guitars
 Jesper Valentin Holm, Vocals and Drums
 Niels Ole Præstbro, Vocals and Bass

Discography
 Lovesize (4-track single, 1996)
 Perfect Daze (Album, 1998)
 Porcelain in space (Pre-production for TwbG album, 2000)
 Tomorrow will be Great (Album, 2001)
 Glittergirl (4-track single, 2006)

People who have worked with Porcelain
 Dan Stielow (Lidocaine)
 Leo Wassinger
 Mark Pilkington
 Robert Lund (Kitty Wu)
 Claus Bergmann (Kitty Wu)
 Henrik Søgaard (Passion Orange, Twoface)
 Per Lange
 Boe Larsen (Millfactory)
 Morten Munck (Millfactory)
 Søren Mikkelsen (Medley)
 Bo Karlsen (White Dwarf)

References

External links

 Yousee.musik.tdconline.dk
 Imusic.dk
 Soundstation.dk
 Myspace.com
 Discogs.com
 Musicstack.com
 Worldcat.org
 E-pages.dk
 Gaffa.dk

Danish rock music groups
Musical groups established in 1996